Makerere University College of Health Sciences (MakCHS) is a constituent college of Makerere University, Uganda's oldest university. The schools of the college offer undergraduate and postgraduate courses in the biomedical sciences, health sciences, human medicine and public health, covering a broad range of disciplines and specialties.

Location
The schools of the college are spread across the southern, western, northern and eastern parts of Mulago Hill and include Mulago Hospital Complex, the college's teaching hospital. The coordinates of the college are: 00°20'18.0"N 32°34'38.0"E (Latitude:0.338333; Longitude:32.577213).

Overview
The college was created by Makerere University in 2007. At the time it was created, it consisted of four schools, with the college headed by a Principal and a Deputy Principal, while each school is headed by a Dean. In June 2016, at the insistence of East African Community (EAC) Medical and Dental Practitioners Boards and Councils, the college created Makerere University School of Dentistry, increasing the number of schools to five.

Schools
As of June 2016, the following schools comprised the Makerere University College of Health Sciences:

 Makerere University School of Biomedical Sciences - MUSBS
 Makerere University School of Health Sciences - MUSHS
 Makerere University School of Medicine - MUSM
 Makerere University School of Public Health - MUSPH
 Makerere University School of Dentistry - MUSD

Undergraduate courses
The following undergraduate courses are offered at MUCHS. Instruction in most courses is carried out across several different schools within the college. The school responsible for awarding a particular qualification is indicated in bold letters.

 Bachelor of Science in Medical Radiography - MUSM
 Bachelor of Science in Speech and Language Therapy - MUSM
 Bachelor of Medicine and Bachelor of Surgery - MUSM
 Bachelor of Science in Biomedical Engineering - MUSBS
 Bachelor of Science in Cytotechnology - MUSBS
 Bachelor of Science in Biomedical Sciences - MUSBS
 Bachelor of Science in Nursing - MUSHS
 Bachelor of Pharmacy - MUSHS
 Bachelor of Dental Surgery - MUSD
 Bachelor of Optometry  - MUSHS
 Bachelor of Science in Dental Laboratory Technology - MUSHS
 Bachelor of Environmental Health Sciences - MUSPH

Graduate Courses
The following postgraduate courses are offered at MUCHS. Instruction is offered across several schools of the college. The school that is ultimately responsible for awarding the postgraduate degree is indicated in bold ink.

 Master of Medicine (MMed) in Anesthesiology - MUSM 
 Master of Medicine (MMed) in Family Medicine - MUSM
 Master of Medicine (MMed) in Internal Medicine -MUSM
 Master of Science (MSc) in Nursing - MUSHS
 Master of Medicine (MMed) in Orthopaedic Surgery - MUSM
 Master of Medicine (MMed) in Obstetrics and Gynecology - MUSM
 Master of Medicine (MMed) in Ophthalmology - MUSM
 Master of Medicine (MMed) in Otolaryngology - MUSM
 Master of Medicine (MMed) in Pediatrics and Child Health - MUSM
 Master of Medicine (MMed) in Psychiatry - MUSM
 Master of Medicine (MMed) in General Surgery - MUSM
 Master of Science (MSc) in Pharmacology - MUSBS
 Master of Medicine (MMed) in Radiology - MUSM
 Master of Medicine (MMed) in Microbiology - MUSBS
 Master of Medicine (MMed) in Pathology - MUSBS
 Master of Science (MSc) in Human Anatomy - MUSBM
 Master of Science (MSc) in Clinical Epidemiology and Biostatistics - MUSBS
 Master of Science (MSc) in Physiology - MUSBS
 Master of Science (MSc) in Medical Illustration - MUSBS
 Master of Science (MSc) in Allied Health Sciences - MUSHS
 Master of Science (MSc) in Nursing - MUSHS
 Master of Science (MSc) in Clinical Chemistry - MUSBS
 Master of Pharmacy (MPharm) - MUSHS
 Master of Dental Surgery (MDS) - MUSHS
 Master of Public Health (MPH) - MUSPH
 Doctor of Public Health (DrPH) - MUSPH
 Doctor of Medicine (MD) - MUSM
 Doctor of Philosophy (PhD) - All Schools of MUCHS

In addition to the postgraduate degree courses, the College of Health Sciences at Makerere University offers several postgraduate courses including:

 Postgraduate Diploma in Anesthesiology - MUSM
 Postgraduate Diploma in Quality of Health Care - MUSPH

Albert Cook Memorial Library
The Albert Cook Memorial Library, also Albert Cook Medical Library is the main library of Makerere University College of Health Sciences. The library, named after Sir Albert Cook (22 March 1870 – 23 April 1951), the founder of  Mulago Hospital and Mengo Hospital, was established in 1924, by Dr. Cook. The library houses an archive of Dr. Albert Cook's original handwritten patient notes dating back to 1900.

The library underwent a renovation in 1968 and another major renovation in 2018; the last one funded by a USh197 billion (US$52,000) grant from Stanbic Bank Uganda Limited, Uganda's largest commercial bank by assets.

See also
 Education in Uganda
 Makerere University
 Medical Schools in Uganda
 Makerere University School of Biomedical Sciences
 Makerere University School of Health Sciences
 Makerere University School of Medicine
 Makerere University School of Public Health

References

External links
 Makerere University Homepage
 Makerere University College of Health Sciences Homepage
  Makerere To Develop TB Treatment

External links
 Official Webpage

Makerere University
Medical schools in Uganda